{{infobox book
| name = 1. Path of the Fury2. In Fury Born
| title_orig =
| translator =
| image = File:Path of the Fury.jpg
| caption = First edition (1992)
| author = David Weber
| illustrator =
| cover_artist = Paul Alexander
| country = United States
| language = English
| series =
| genre = Space opera
| publisher = Baen Books
| release_date = December 1992, August 2007
| media_type = Print (Paperback)
| pages =
| isbn =  0-671-72147-X
| isbn_note=In Fury Born
| oclc= 26998552
| preceded_by = 
| followed_by = In Fury Born (contains prequel story and a slightly revised version of Path of the Fury) }}Path of the Fury and the later re-issuance with new material and a full prequel novel as In Fury Born are stand-alone science fiction novels by American writer David Weber, covering the life and times of female protagonist Alicia DeVries.

The original Path of the Fury opens with Alicia DeVries having been in retirement and resettled to the frontier with her extended family, whereas in the new novel she lives at home with her family and progresses from school girl to marine recruit through specialty training and participates with distinction in an interstellar war; the prequel climaxes by detailing her later war experiences after she joins an elite special forces unit of "drop commandos" where she becomes a bona fide hero several times over. Furthermore, In Fury Born goes back to cover the early career of the protagonist and better organize the universe as a setting for additional series' works, and is the longer of the two novels—detailing topics of great interest in and of themselves up to and including a climactic event in her military career that caused her to retire young, but with great honors and background material such as the political astrography—then segues seamlessly into the original novel presented in virtually unaltered form, excepting only tweaks to some of the background explanations, setting up future sequels. 
 
The original novel presents her story after she retires from active military duty and has joined her family in migration to a settlement on the frontiers of the governing empire, with mere mentions of the events detailed in the newly added prequel novel. In Fury Born begins with the rearing and military career of the protagonist while Path of the Fury centers around former elite commando Alicia DeVries's quest to attain revenge on the interstellar pirates who killed her family. In the early chapters of the original works, she is rescued and becomes allied with the weakened drifting spirit of Tisiphone, one of the Greek mythological Furies, who in compensation moves into one corner of Alicia's mind and imbues her with superhuman abilities. The material in the prequel was only alluded to in flashbacks in the original novel.

The works are strongly in Weber's military science fiction vein, and its main character not dissimilar to Weber's other strong female protagonists such as Honor Harrington, and numerous technological elements reference other Weber series (such as the bio-implants, also found in the Dahak series).

Plot summary

Alicia DeVries had retired to Mathison's World, a remote fringe world of the Terran Empire—a puissant interstellar polity sprawling over several sectors, and bordered by the hostile and alien Rishathan Sphere ("the Lizards"), both of which are bordered by the Quarn Hegemony ("the Spiders"), a race of fanatic businessmen allied with the humans against the Rishathan, reputedly because the Rishathan cannot take a joke.

Alicia forced her retirement at so young an age after she'd taken a royal prisoner that felt honor bound to disclose the traitor in the midst of the Empire's military intelligence establishment, the traitor who had sent her unit into a deliberate trap and so had undoubted culpability in getting most all of her former unit killed in the prior operation.

Her retirement had been quiet and idyllic, until the day an extremely brutal group of space pirates razed her world and landed at her homestead, killing her younger brother, grandfather and parents. Out hunting a predator armed with only a hunting rifle and a survival knife, the raiders did not detect Alicia, and upon her return she slew all 25 of them before they could retreat to their shuttle—but at the cost of grievous wounds inflicted upon her person. As she lay dying, she wished fervidly to live in order to strike at those who had ordered the strike against her and others homes, at any cost: a long quiescent entity accepts her bargain.

Tisiphone, one of the legendary three Greek Erinyes (Furies of Greek mythology), cannot heal Alicia's wounds, and so decides to instead take Alicia to a place "where time has no business" while rescuers are awaited. Rescuers eventually do come, but not before three separate over-flights fail to discover Alicia. Because her survival is deeply anomalous and inexplicable, Alicia is held in Fleet custody during her convalescence, and eventually handed over to personnel from the Imperial Cadre (the Emperor's elite special forces popularly known as "drop commandos"), which Alicia is legally still part of. Because of some unguarded conversations with Tisiphone, Alicia is believed to be insane, and an insane drop commando is not to be left to her own devices. So Alicia is transported to the sector capital Soissons for more advanced psychological testing and evaluation. Tisiphone spends her time infiltrating and cracking the military computer systems, plotting their escape—the Cadre clearly intends to hold onto Alicia until the anomalies are explained to their satisfaction; an untenable restraint on Alicia's seeking of revenge. Unbeknownst to Alicia, Tisiphone's plan, when executed, has Alicia leaving her hospital room, defeating the unobtrusively placed Cadreman placed to prevent just such an escape, stealing an air-breathing "skimmer" craft to travel to the spaceport and then arrange for it to look like its destruction also caused Alicia's death. Tisiphone did not stop at merely faking Alicia's death, but at the spaceport is a fully armed and prepared assault shuttle (with a suit of Cadre armor for Alicia), which she steals; the shuttle takes her to a very special ship finishing construction above Soissons: an "alpha synth".

Most ships in the Path of the Fury follow a simplified pattern very similar to the one used in Weber's Honorverse, with relatively minor differences of mechanics and technology (different sub-light and FTL drive systems, true AI in the Fury universe but not the Honorverse, etc.) but the alpha synth class of vessels is peculiar to the Fury universe: it is a large vessel, with provisions for exactly one human, who pilots it by having previously mentally fused with the advanced cutting edge ("alpha") AI which runs every system on the armed-to-the-teeth vessel; Weber describes it thus: "The size of a big light cruiser yet possessed of more firepower than a battle-cruiser and faster than a destroyer, literally able to think for itself and respond with light-speed swiftness, an alpha synth was lethal beyond belief, ton for ton the most deadly weapon ever built by man." Tisiphone defeats the security systems, during which battle the sleeping AI accidentally awakes and impresses on Alicia—but not melding, rather, forming a second personality patterned on Alicia's own, but fiercely devoted to the protection of the first. Since the new AI personality has as little right to exist as Alicia does to be stealing the alpha synth, it naturally throws its lot in with Alicia and Tisiphone. The trio blast out of the system at high speed, easily eluding the warships sent after them and the star system's ring of defensive forts.

All the while, the pirates continue their raids and their murder of millions at the behest of their shadowy commander and his enigmatic plan.

Alicia and company go into business as couriers specializing in securely and swiftly delivering small cargoes; naturally many of these cargoes are illicit. Using Tisiphone's mind-reading and twisting abilities, they swiftly move their way through the criminal elements of various Rogue (independent) human worlds, tracking down the pirates' suppliers and fences.

Simultaneously, Ben Belkassem, a senior field operative with the feared Operations branch of the Empire's Justice Department, is following up the same leads. Their paths intersect when Alicia tracks down the final link in the supply chain, one Oscar Quintana, when one of the visiting pirate officers (who turns out to be a former Imperial Fleet officer, and their vessels former Fleet vessels) becomes suspicious and tries to drug Alicia with a truth serum. Among the many advanced and secret modifications made to a drop commando's body are a set of programs, sensors/computers, and chemicals intended to detect capture and/or interrogation, and then either kill the captors and escape, or failing that, kill the drop commando; as Alicia's cover as a starship captain did not allow for such autonomic responses, her cover was blown. The situation goes south and Alicia is saved by the armed intervention of Belkassem. Having sucked the location of the pirate fleet out of the dying officer's mind, Alicia and Belkassem take the alpha synth (now named Megarea) to a system previously devastated by the pirates, Ringbolt, which holds the dubious distinction of being the epicenter of a vast assemblage of interstellar mercenaries eager to destroy the pirates in retaliation for the pirates' devastation of their home.

After forming a unified plan of attack, Megarea attacks the pirates, damaging several vessels heavily, but herself being damaged. Since she had a close look at them (and had discovered the secret of their true Fleet origins), and cannot truly elude them, the pirates have no choice but to follow her into FTL to silence her. Her lure leads them straight into the teeth of the waiting mercenaries. The pirates are ripped apart by the mercenaries, aided by Fleet (which observed the mercenaries' departure from Ringbolt and reasoned correctly as to the why and wherefore). Unfortunately, Fleet has shoot-on-sight orders as concerns the rogue drop commando and her alpha synth, which forces Alicia to flee. Tisiphone had previously cracked the pirates' networks and Megarea had killed the flagship dreadnaught's AI, incidentally gaining knowledge of just how the pirates had had such excellent intelligence and just how their records falsified and ships acquired: the pirates' depredations were intended to suck Fleet units into that sector. When the military buildup proved insufficient to stop the pirates, they were to serve as a Reichstag fire-style excuse for the sector governor, Treadwell (a brilliant military strategist) to secede. He would then arrange a mock battle in which the pirates would appear to be destroyed; in the wake of this victory, Treadwell would no doubt freely and fairly be elected by his people as Emperor, for ending the threat the original Empire proved so impotent against.

Blinded by rage, Alicia plans to ram her battered alpha synth into Governor Treadwell's base, an orbital fortress. Unbeknownst to her, the selfsame Fleet unit which had forced her to flee had also brought along a battalion of drop commandos, which focused their attention on assaulting the drifting hulk of the pirate dreadnaught and extracted from it the sole surviving senior officer. Under interrogation, she gave up the same information Tisiphone had discovered. Realizing that Alicia had no way of knowing that they had proof of Treadwell's treason, and that she would take matters into her own hand (because she had no way of knowing whether the rot went up even higher than Treadwell), and exactly what sort of plan she could some up with, Brigadier Sir Arthur Keita—Alicia's former commanding officer—her best friend (Major Tanis Cateau) and Inspector Ferhat Ben Belkassem race off in a dispatch boat to intercept Alicia at Soissons.

Disaster is barely averted by the simultaneous intercession of Tisiphone and her friends and allies on a collision course with her snap Alicia out of her madness. Treadwell and his conspirators are duly executed.

For their good work, Alicia is issued a full pardon, Megarea'' is granted her freedom as a sentient entity (Strictly speaking she belonged to the Fleet who had constructed her), and even Tisiphone is awarded a (secret) commendation. Impressed by the intelligence work she did, O Branch (through Ben Belkassem) offers the trio a place in it (and to pay for the numerous expenses involved in maintaining and supplying an alpha synth), which they accept.

1992 American novels
1992 science fiction novels
American science fiction novels
Military science fiction novels
Novels by David Weber